Unity List may refer to:

 Red-Green Alliance (Denmark)
 Unity List (Austria)